Matt Eckerl (born May 13, 1984) is a professional lacrosse player with the Washington Bayhawks of Major League Lacrosse.

Professional career 
Eckerl joined the Major League Lacrosse Washington Bayhawks in 2007.  He also was a member of the 2008 Philadelphia Wings of the National Lacrosse League as member of the practice team.

College career 
Played college lacrosse for Towson University where he is the all-time career leader in ground balls.  Graduated as one of the top face-off men in the college game and was awarded pre-season honorable mention All-American honors by FAce-Off Magazine and Inside Lacrosse in 2005 and 2006.  Was named the CAA Co-Player of the Week after his performance in Towson's game against Drexel University.

High school
2003 graduate of Calvert Hall College High School in Towson, MD. Earned All State honors in football and lacrosse his senior year at Calvert Hall.

Personal 
Hobbies include watching movies, hanging out, and playing video games.  His favorite television show is Entourage.  His favorite food is anything homemade and his favorite movie is Good Will Hunting.

External links 
 washingtonbayhawks.com
 Washington Bayhawks Player Profile
 Supplemental Draft Results

References 

1984 births
Living people
Philadelphia Wings players
American lacrosse players
Major League Lacrosse players
Towson Tigers men's lacrosse players